Bañado Norte is a slum village in Asuncion, Paraguay, near the Paraguay River. It was visited by Pope Francis  on July 12, 2015. There is a Roman Catholic chapel called Chapel of San Juan Bautista.

References

Neighbourhoods of Asunción